Tayo Odueke  (born 21 February 1976), professionally known as Sikiratu Sindodo  is a Nigerian actress and producer.

Early life and education
Born on 21 February 1976 in Ijebu Ode, Ogun State. Odueke attended  Mainland Preparatory Nursery and Primary School in Surulere, Lagos State before she later proceeded to the Methodist Girls High School, Yaba, Lagos.
She obtained a Diploma  in Theatre Arts from the University of Ibadan.

Career 
Odueke featured in her first movie titled Hired Assassin.  The movie Sikiratu Sindodo brought her into the limelight for  her character role in the movie. In 2013, she was nominated for Best Lead Actress (Indigenous) at the Zulu African Film Academy Awards.

Filmography
 Hired Assassin
 Sikiratu Sindodo
 Itu
 Were Alaso
 Ikan
 Efa
 Dokita Orun
 Imado
 Khadijat Ero mi Ogo Mushin Looking for Baami''

References 

1976 births
Living people
Yoruba actresses
Nigerian film actresses
Actresses in Yoruba cinema
University of Ibadan alumni
Nigerian film producers
Nigerian women film producers